Santullano is one of 28 parishes (administrative divisions) in Salas, a municipality within the province and autonomous community of Asturias, in northern Spain.

Villages and hamlets
El Monte 
El Pozo (El Pozu)
La Peral 
Mouroso (Mourosu) 
Prada 
Santullano (Santuyanu)

References  

Parishes in Salas